Danahy is a surname. Notable people with the surname include:

 Paul Danahy (1928-2022), American politician and judge
 Pat Danahy (born 1985), American rugby union player

See also
 20312 Danahy, a main-belt asteroid
 Dennehy

English-language surnames